Vardavard-e Vosta (also Romanized as Vardāvard-e Vosţá; also known as Var Dāvad-e Vasaţī, Vardāvad-e Vosţá, Vardāvard, Vard Āvard-e Vasaţ, Vardāvard-e Vasaţī, and Vardood Vosta) is a village in Khorram Rud Rural District, in the Central District of Tuyserkan County, Hamadan Province, Iran. At the 2006 census, its population was 327, in 93 families.

References 

Populated places in Tuyserkan County